Zachary Bailey (born 23 September 1999) is a professional Australian rules footballer playing for the Brisbane Lions in the Australian Football League (AFL). He was drafted by Brisbane with their second selection and fifteenth overall in the 2017 national draft.

In round three of 2021, Bailey kicked the match winning goal after the siren to win the game against Collingwood at Marvel Stadium, this came a week after he tackled Geelong’s Mark Blicavs in last few seconds in the game at GMHBA Stadium that was controversially not paid holding the ball to Bailey.

Statistics
Updated to the end of the 2022 season.

|-
| 2018 ||  || 33
| 12 || 6 || 4 || 76 || 86 || 162 || 36 || 28 || 0.5 || 0.3 || 6.3 || 7.2 || 13.5 || 3.0 || 2.3 || 0
|-
| 2019 ||  || 33
| 15 || 5 || 5 || 106 || 74 || 180 || 38 || 29 || 0.3 || 0.3 || 7.1 || 4.9 || 12.0 || 2.5 || 1.9 || 0
|-
| 2020 ||  || 33
| 19 || 13 || 9 || 166 || 89 || 255 || 76 || 47 || 0.7 || 0.5 || 8.7 || 4.7 || 13.4 || 4.0 || 2.5 || 1
|-
| 2021 ||  || 33
| 24 || 31 || 18 || 273 || 167 || 440 || 77 || 68 || 1.3 || 0.8 || 11.4 || 7.0 || 18.3 || 3.2 || 2.8 || 4
|-
| 2022 ||  || 33
| 24 || 37 || 18 || 271 || 141 || 412 || 96 || 52 || 1.5 || 0.7 || 11.2 || 5.8 || 17.1 || 4.0 || 2.1 || 5
|- class=sortbottom
! colspan=3 | Career
! 94 !! 92 !! 54 !! 892 !! 557 !! 1449 !! 323 !! 224 !! 0.9 !! 0.5 !! 9.4 !! 5.9 !! 15.4 !! 3.4 !! 2.3 !! 10
|}

Notes

Honours and achievements
Individual
 Marcus Ashcroft Medal: 2022 (round 6)

References

External links

1999 births
Living people
Brisbane Lions players
Australian rules footballers from the Northern Territory